The National Reserve Headquarters, Royal Artillery (NRHQ RA) is an Army Reserve administrative group of the Royal Artillery which oversees the recruitment and maintaining of specialist reserve units and personnel.

Formation 
Prior to the review of the Territorial Army in 1967, all territorial troops who joined the Royal Artillery were organised through the Royal Artillery Depot based at Royal Artillery Barracks, Woolwich Garrison.  However, as part of the reorganisation of the TA in 1967, all TA specialist units and formations were grouped under a single unit.

The new unit was formed as part of TAVR IIB, meaning it was able to deploy independent assets, but would be unable to deploy as a full unit (TAVR IIA would have this role).

After the 1966 Defence White Paper, the Central Volunteer Headquarters, Royal Artillery (CVHQ, RA) was formed at the before-mentioned barracks and placed under Headquarters, London District as a nationally recruited specialist TA unit.

After formation, the headquarters was organised as follows:

 Central Volunteer Headquarters, Royal Artillery
 Regimental Headquarters, at Royal Artillery Barracks, Woolwich Station
 Naval Gunfire Support Troop (formed from part of 881 Amphibious Observation Battery)
 Royal Artillery Specialist Pool (V)
 Heavy Air Defence Section (The Wessex Troop), (formed from part of 457th  (Wessex) Heavy Air Defence Regiment (Hampshire Carabiniers Yeomanry))
 Light Air Defence Section
 Field Artillery Section
 Liaison Officers Section
 Meteorological Section
 Location Section (two officers only, training under 94th Locating Regiment)

Army 2020 
Following the Army 2020 reform, and later the Army 2020 Refine, the CVHQ, RA was retitled as the National Reserve Headquarters, Royal Artillery, and reorganised into the following structure:

 National Reserve Headquarters, Royal Artillery
 Regimental Headquarters, at Royal Artillery Barracks, Woolwich Station
 All Arms Staff Pool — made up of personnel from every cap badge, who train with formation headquarters in the Army, including HQ Allied Rapid Reaction Corps, both Divisions and most of the Army's Brigades.
 221 (Wessex) Battery, at Royal Artillery Barracks, Larkhill Garrison — The RA Specialist Battery provides gunnery instructors, Naval Gunfire Liaison Officers to 3 Commando Brigade and personnel to support Headquarters of 1DSR Brigade. The battery also helps train the rest of the Royal Artillery by providing instructors and support to courses.
 255 (Somerset Yeomanry) Tactical Air Control Party Battery, at Upper Bristol Road Army Reserve Centre, Bath— The Forward Air Control Battery controls combat aircraft in support of ground troops.

Footnotes

References 

 

Royal Artillery regiments
Military units and formations established in 1967
Military units and formations in Woolwich
Military units and formations in Wiltshire
Military units and formations in Somerset